Tveten is a Norwegian surname. Notable people with the surname include:

Alf Tveten (1912–1997), Norwegian sailor
Olav Tveten (1907–1980), Norwegian architect

See also
Tveter

Norwegian-language surnames